The Flatiron Building, originally the Fuller Building, is a triangular 22-story,  steel-framed landmarked building at 175 Fifth Avenue in the eponymous Flatiron District neighborhood of the borough of Manhattan in New York City. Designed by Daniel Burnham and Frederick P. Dinkelberg, it was completed in 1902 and originally contained 20 floors. The building sits on a triangular block formed by Fifth Avenue, Broadway, and East 22nd Street—where the building's  back end is located—with East 23rd Street grazing the triangle's northern (uptown) peak. The name "Flatiron" derives from its triangular shape, which recalls that of a cast-iron clothes iron.

The Flatiron Building was developed as the headquarters of construction firm Fuller Company, which acquired the site from the Newhouse family in May 1901. Construction proceeded at a very rapid pace, and the building opened on October 1, 1902. A "cowcatcher" retail space and a one-story penthouse were added shortly after the building's opening. The Fuller Company sold the building in 1925 to an investment syndicate. The Equitable Life Assurance Society took over the building after a foreclosure auction in 1933 and sold it to another syndicate in 1945. Helmsley-Spear managed the building for much of the late 20th century, renovating it several times. The Newmark Group started managing the building in 1997. The building's ownership was divided among several companies, which started renovating the building again in 2019.

The Flatiron Building's facade is divided vertically into three sections, similarly to the components of a classical column. The three-story base is clad with limestone, while the upper stories are clad with glazed terracotta. The building's steel frame, designed by structural engineering firm Purdy and Henderson, was intended to withstand four times the maximum wind force of the area. Called "one of the world's most iconic skyscrapers and a quintessential symbol of New York City", the building anchors the south (downtown) end of Madison Square and the north (uptown) end of the Ladies' Mile Historic District. The neighborhood around it is called the Flatiron District after its signature, iconic building. The building was designated a New York City landmark in 1966, was added to the National Register of Historic Places in 1979, and was designated a National Historic Landmark in 1989.

Site 
The Flatiron Building sits on a triangular block formed by Fifth Avenue to the west, Broadway to the east, and East 22nd Street to the south. The western and eastern facades converge, forming a "peak" at its northern corner where Fifth Avenue and Broadway intersect with East 23rd Street. The shape of the site arises from Broadway's diagonal alignment relative to the Manhattan street grid. Above the ground level, all three corners of the triangle are curved.  

Adjacent buildings include the Toy Center to the north, the Sohmer Piano Building to the southwest, the Scribner Building to the south, and Madison Green to the southeast. The Flatiron Building is at the northern end of the Ladies' Mile Historic District, which extends between 15th Street to the south and 24th Street to the north. By the 1990s, the blocks south of the building had also become known as the Flatiron District.

Earlier usage 
The St. Germain Hotel (alternatively spelled St. Germaine) was built by 1855 on the south end of the lot. It was one of several hotels built in the neighborhood during the mid-19th century. Amos Eno purchased the entire block in 1857 for $32,000, and he shortly built the Fifth Avenue Hotel on a site diagonally across from it. At some point after 1880, Eno tore down the St. Germain Hotel and replaced it with a seven-story apartment building, the Cumberland. On the remainder of the lot, he built four three-story buildings for commercial use. This left four stories of the Cumberland's northern face exposed, which Eno rented out to advertisers, including The New York Times, which installed a sign made up of electric lights. The sign, the first of its kind in New York City, was a precursor to the Great White Way near Times Square. Eno later put a canvas screen on the wall, projecting images from a magic lantern atop one of his smaller buildings, where he alternately presented advertisements and interesting pictures. Both the Times and the New-York Tribune began using the screen for news bulletins, and on election nights tens of thousands of people would gather in Madison Square, waiting for the latest results.

The site came to be known by many names, including "Eno's flatiron", "Eno's corner", and "the cow catcher". Although Eno was one of the largest landowners in New York City by 1894, he rejected all offers to purchase the flatiron site during his lifetime. After his death in 1899, his assets were liquidated, and the lot went up for sale. The New York State Assembly appropriated $3 million for the city to buy it, but this fell through when a newspaper reporter discovered that the plan was a graft scheme by Tammany Hall boss Richard Croker. Instead, the lot was bought at auction by William Eno, one of Amos's sons, for $690,000 in April 1899. This was more than 20 times what the elder Eno had paid for the property four decades earlier.

In May 1899, just three weeks after William had acquired the flatiron lot, he resold it to Samuel and Mott Newhouse for around $801,000. The Newhouses intended to erect a 12-story building with retail shops at street level and bachelor apartments above. They announced plans for the building in November 1900, but the plans were not executed, even though the value of land lots in the city was increasing. At the time, eight- to ten-story office and commercial buildings were being developed in the neighborhood, replacing older, shorter commercial structures.

History 
At the beginning of March 1901, media outlets reported that the Newhouse family was planning to sell "Eno's flatiron" for about $2 million to Cumberland Realty Company, an investment partnership created by Harry S. Black, CEO of the Fuller Company. The Fuller Company was the first true general contractor that dealt with all aspects of buildings' construction (except for design), and they specialized in erecting skyscrapers. Black intended to construct a new headquarters building on the site, despite the recent deterioration of the surrounding neighborhood. At the end of that March, the Fuller Company organized a subsidiary to develop a building on the site. The sale was finalized in May 1901.

Development

Plans and site-clearing 
Black hired Daniel Burnham's architectural firm to design a 21-story building on the site in February 1901. It would be Burnham's first in New York City, the tallest building in Manhattan north of the Financial District, and the first skyscraper north of Union Square (at 14th Street). The Northwestern Salvage and Wrecking Company began razing the site in May 1901, after the majority of existing tenants' leases had expired. Most of the Cumberland's remaining tenants readily vacated the building in exchange for monetary compensation. The sole holdout was Winfield Scott Proskey, a retired colonel who refused to move out until his lease expired later that year. Cumberland Realty unsuccessfully attempted to deactivate Proskey's water and gas supply, and Proskey continued to live in the Cumberland while contractors demolished all of the surrounding apartments. By the end of May 1901, Cumberland Realty discovered that Proskey was bankrupt, and his creditors took over the lease and razed the rest of the Cumberland that June.

The New York Herald published an image of the site on June 2, 1901, with the caption "Flatiron Building". The project's structural engineer, Corydon Purdy, filed plans for a 20-story building on the site were filed that August. The Flatiron Building was not the first building of its triangular ground-plan, although it was the largest at the time of its completion. Earlier buildings with a similar shape include a triangular Roman temple built on a similarly constricted site in the city of Verulamium, Britannia; Bridge House, Leeds, England (1875); the I.O.O.F. Centennial Building (1876) in Alpena, Michigan; and the English-American Building in Atlanta (1897). The Real Estate Record and Guide published a drawing of the building in October 1901; though the drawing was captioned "The Cumberland", it was very similar to the Flatiron Building's final design.

Construction 
The Atlantic Terra Cotta Company began producing architectural terracotta pieces for the building in August 1901. Around the same time, the New York City Department of Buildings (DOB) indicated that it would refuse to approve Purdy's initial plans unless the engineers submitted detailed information about the framework, fireproofing, and wind-bracing systems. Purdy complied with most of the DOB's requests, submitting detailed drawings and documents, but he balked at the department's requirement that the design include fire escapes. For reasons that are unclear, the DOB dropped its requirement that the building contain fire escapes. In addition, the building was originally legally required to contain metal-framed windows, although this would have increased the cost of construction. The city's Board of Building Commissioners had granted an exemption to Black's syndicate, prompting allegations of favoritism. A new Buildings Department commissioner was appointed at the beginning of 1902, promising to enforce city building codes; this prompted general contractor Thompson–Starrett Co. to announce that the building's window frames would be made of fireproof wood with a copper coating.

The building's steel frame was manufactured by the American Bridge Company in Pennsylvania. The frame had risen above street level by January 1902. Construction was then halted for several weeks, first because of a delay in steel shipments, then because of a blizzard that occurred in February. Further delays were caused by a strike at the factory of Hecla Iron Works, which was manufacturing elevators and handrails for the building. The steel was so meticulously pre-cut that, according to The New York Times, the steel pieces could be connected "without so much as the alteration of a bored hole, or the exchange of a tiny rivet". Workers used air-powered tools to rivet the steel beams together, since such equipment was more efficient than steam-powered tools at conducting power over long distances. The frame was complete by February 1902, and workers began installing the terracotta tiles as the framework of the top stories were being finished. By mid-May, the building was half-covered by terracotta tiling. The terracotta work was completed the next month, and the scaffolding in front of the building was removed. The Fifth Avenue Building Company had invested $1.5 million in the project. 

Officials of the Fuller Company announced in August 1902 that the structure would be officially named after George A. Fuller, founder of the Fuller Company and "father of the skyscraper", who had died two years earlier. By then, the site had been known as the "flatiron" for several years; according to Christopher Gray of The New York Times, Burnham's and Fuller's architectural drawings even labeled the structure as the "Flatiron Building". Although the Fuller name was used for some time after the building's completion, locals persisted in calling it the Flatiron, to the displeasure of Harry Black and the building's contractors. In subsequent years, the edifice officially came to be known as the Flatiron Building, and the Fuller name was transferred to a newer 40-story structure at 597 Madison Avenue.

Fuller Company ownership 
In the weeks before the official opening, the Fuller Company distributed six-page brochures to potential tenants and real-estate brokers. The brochures advertised the building as being "ready for occupancy" on October 1, 1902. The Fuller Company took the 19th floor for its headquarters. When completed, the Flatiron Building was much taller than others in the neighborhood; when New York City Fire Department officials tested the building's standpipes in November 1902, they found that "the 'flat-iron' building would be of great aid in fighting the fire" in any surrounding buildings. Following the building's completion, the surrounding neighborhood evolved from an entertainment district to a commercial hub. Initially, the building was topped by a flagpole, which was maintained by one man, "Steeplejack" Kay, for four decades. Henry Clay Frick expressed interest in purchasing the structure in 1904 for $5 million, but he ultimately withdrew his offer.

Modifications 
During the building's construction, Black had suggested that the "cowcatcher" retail space be installed at the northern tip of the building, occupying  of unused space at the extreme northern end of the lot. This would maximize use of the building's lot and produce some retail income. Burnham initially refused to consider Black's suggestion, and, in April 1902, Black asked a draftsman at the Fuller Company to draw up plans for the retail space. Black submitted plans for the annex to the DOB in May 1902. The DOB rejected the initial plans because the walls were too thin, but the department approved a revised proposal that June, to Burnham's disapproval. The retail space in the "cowcatcher" was leased by United Cigar Stores.

Another addition to the building not in the original plan was the penthouse, which was constructed after the rest of the building had been completed. By 1905, the Fuller Company needed to expand its technical drawing facilities. As a result, the company filed plans for a penthouse with the New York City Department of Buildings that March. The penthouse would cost $10,000 and would include fireproof partitions and a staircase from the existing 20th floor. The penthouse, intended for use as artists' studios, was quickly rented out to artists such as Louis Fancher, many of whom contributed to the pulp magazines which were produced in the offices below.

Early tenants 
Besides the Fuller Company, the Flatiron's other original tenants included publishers such as magazine publishing pioneer Frank Munsey, American Architect and Building News, and a vanity publisher. An insurance company, the Equitable Life Assurance Society, leased nearly the entire third floor. Small businesses also occupied the Flatiron, including a patent medicine company; the Western Specialty Manufacturing Company; and Whitehead & Hoag, which made celluloid novelties. Other tenants included an overflow of music publishers from "Tin Pan Alley" on 28th Street; a landscape architect; the Imperial Russian Consulate, which took up three floors the New York State Athletic Commission; the Bohemian Guides Society; the Roebling Construction Company, owned by the sons of Tammany Hall boss Richard Croker; and the crime syndicate Murder, Inc. Harry Black moved the Fuller Company's offices in 1911 to the Trinity Building at 111 Broadway, where its parent company, U.S. Realty, had its offices. U.S. Realty moved its offices back to the Flatiron in 1916.

The building's vast cellar extended into the vaults that went more than  under the surrounding streets. Initial plans called for a ratskeller to be opened within the vaults, but Manhattan borough president Jacob A. Cantor had objected to the plans. Ultimately, part of the basement was occupied by the Flatiron Restaurant, which could seat 1,500 patrons and was open from breakfast through late supper for those taking in a performance at one of the many theatres which lined Broadway between 14th and 23rd Streets. In the building's early years, sightseeing buses would bring visitors to the Flatiron Restaurant and to the 21st-story observation deck. In 1911, the building introduced a restaurant/club in the basement. It was among the first of its kind that allowed a black jazz band to perform, thus introducing ragtime to affluent New Yorkers.

Even before construction on the Flatiron Building had begun, the area around Madison Square had started to deteriorate somewhat. After U.S. Realty constructed the New York Hippodrome, Madison Square Garden was no longer the venue of choice, and survived largely by staging boxing matches. The base of the Flatiron became a cruising spot for gay men, including some male prostitutes. Nonetheless, in 1911 the Flatiron Restaurant was bought by Louis Bustanoby, of the well-known Café des Beaux-Arts, and converted into a trendy 400-seat French restaurant, Taverne Louis. As an innovation to attract customers from another restaurant opened by his brothers, Bustanoby hired a black musical group, Louis Mitchell and his Southern Symphony Quintette, to play dance tunes at the Taverne and the Café. Irving Berlin heard the group at the Taverne and suggested that they should try to get work in London, which they did. The Taverne also welcomed a gay clientele, which then was unusual for a restaurant of its type. The Taverne was forced to close after Prohibition negatively impacted restaurant business.

Rosenbaum and Equitable ownership
In March 1925, Black agreed to sell the Flatiron Building to a syndicate led by Lewis Rosenbaum, which also owned numerous other notable buildings around the U.S. Although the sale price was not revealed, the building was valued at $2 million, about the same as what Black had paid to buy the lot and erecting the Flatiron. The syndicate paid $500,000 in cash and covered the remainder of the purchase price with a long-term mortgage; the transaction provided cash for the financially struggling U.S. Realty Company. Many pottery, glassware, and china firms leased space for display firms within the Flatiron Building through the late 1920s. Additionally, drug-store chain Walgreens opened a store within the "cowcatcher" space in 1927, replacing the United Cigar store. By then, many businesses were moving further northward, including the Fuller Company, which left permanently for the Fuller Building on Madison Avenue in 1929. The Flatiron's operating costs were increasing, and its income decreased greatly with the onset of the Great Depression in 1929. The Flatiron had long since been surpassed in height by other structures, and its roof was "of interest chiefly for its historic associations".

The Equitable Life Assurance Society sued to foreclose upon the building's mortgage in March 1933 after the owners defaulted on mortgage payments. The mortgage had an unpaid principal of more than $1 million, and the owners had not paid interest in more than a year. The building was placed for sale at a foreclosure auction, and Equitable acquired the building on June 30 for $100,000, submitting the only bid at the auction. To attract tenants, Equitable upgraded some parts of the building in 1941. The original cast-iron birdcage elevators, which consisted of rubber-tiled cabs built by Hecla Iron Works, were replaced with enclosed cabs; however, the hydraulic power system remained in place. In addition, the lobby's open grillwork partitions were replaced with marble partitions. The building's heat, light, and elevators were maintained by a team of eight engineers, who sometimes went on strike.

By the mid-1940s, the building was fully rented, and clothing and toy companies took up much of the space. In addition, the building was occupied by firms such as a paper company, an advertiser, and Baseball Magazine. When the U.S. entered World War I, the Federal government instituted a "Wake Up America!" campaign, and the United Cigar store in the Flatiron's cowcatcher donated its space to the U.S. Navy for use as a recruiting center. Liberty Bonds were sold outside on sidewalk stands.

Helmsley-Spear management 
Equitable sold the building in October 1945 to an investment syndicate led by lawyer Max Silverstein; at the time, the structure was valued at $1.05 million. Harry Helmsley's firm Dwight-Helmsley (later Helmsley-Spear) brokered the sale and continued to manage the property. By 1946, the partnership of Flatiron Associates owned the building, and Dwight-Helmsley owned a minority stake in the partnership. The new owners made some superficial changes in the early 1950s, such as adding a dropped ceiling to the lobby and replacing the original mahogany-paneled entrances with revolving doors. After architect George C. Rudolph remodeled the main entrance, the 23rd Street Association gave Dwight-Helmsley an award in 1953, recognizing the firm's "contribution to the development of the Twenty-third Street area". By then, the surrounding area had become largely industrial, with many companies in the publishing, clothing, toy, and manufacturing industries.

In 1959, St. Martin's Press moved into the building, and gradually its parent company, Macmillan, rented other offices as they became available. During its tenancy, Macmillan renovated some of the Flatiron Building's floors for its imprints such as Tor/Forge, Picador and Henry Holt and Company. St. Martin's Press president Thomas McCormack had an office within the building's prow. According to McCormack, the company's authors were "fascinated" by the building; he said it was "the only office I know of where you can stand in one place and see the East River, the Hudson and Central Park without moving". Macmillan wrote about the building:

The Flatiron's interior is known for having its strangely-shaped offices with walls that cut through at an angle on their way to the skyscraper's famous point. These "point" offices are the most coveted and feature amazing northern views that look directly upon another famous Manhattan landmark, the Empire State Building.

The Helmsley/Flatiron Associates ownership structure was a tenancy-in-common, in which all co-owners had to agree on any action, as opposed to a straightforward partnership, in which only a majority of co-owners needed to agree. Hence, it was difficult to get permission for necessary repairs and improvements, and the building declined during the Helmsley/Flatiron Associates era. The surrounding neighborhood declined for several decades, and many of the area's longtime commercial tenants had started to move out. An "anonymous-looking importing firm" occupied the "cowcatcher" retail space, for which there was relatively little demand. The 21st floor and several stories below it were slightly damaged during a fire in 1972. By the late 1980s, one broker said that "the elevators are bad and the facade is dirty" at the Flatiron Building; in particular, there was graffiti across the base, while the rest of the facade was covered in soot. Several of Helmsley's other buildings were similarly rundown.

The facade of the Flatiron Building was restored in 1991 by the firm of Hurley & Farinella. As part of the project, the lobby was renovated, and the terracotta details were also repaired. In addition, C.P. Company leased the ground floor and renovated the space into a clothing store, which opened in February 1991. Bentley LaRosa Salasky designed the store's facade, while Cordero Progetti redesigned the interior, exposing the columns at the building's prow. The surrounding neighborhood's reputation had started to improve, and all of the Flatiron Building's space was under lease. Numerous publishing firms relocated to the area in the late 20th century, and, by the early 1990s, the building's two largest tenants were publishing firms. St. Martin's Press renewed its lease for ten stories of the building in 1993, with an option to expand into smaller tenants' space when their leases expired. Simultaneously, Springer–Verlag renewed its lease for six stories and secured an option for four additional stories. The C.P. Company store only operated until 1996.

Newmark management and split ownership 
By 1995, some of the partners at Flatiron Associates wanted to hire real-estate firm Newmark & Company to replace Helmsley-Spear as the property's managing agent. The dissenting co-owners claimed that Helmsley-Spear was overpaying for elevator maintenance and cleaning. However, the Helmsley family owned a stake in the building, and, because of the tenancy-in-common ownership structure, could block the other owners' attempts to hire Newmark. In 1997, some of the investors sold their 52 percent stake in the building to Newmark, which replaced Helmsley-Spear as the building's managing agent. Shortly after Helmsley's death in January 1997, Helmsley's widow, Leona Helmsley, also sold her ownership stake in the building. Newmark made significant improvements to the property, including installing new electric elevators, replacing the antiquated cabs, which were the last hydraulic elevators in New York City.

Macmillan expansion and conversion proposals 
The Flatiron Building was popular among service companies in the early 2000s, causing rental rates at surrounding buildings to increase. The rent increases occurred amid the gentrification of the surrounding area. By then, St. Martin's Press and Springer–Verlag collectively occupied 90 percent of the space; some of the remaining small tenants had moved away because rents at the Flatiron were too expensive. Macmillan's parent company Holtzbrinck Publishing Group leased additional space in the building in 2004, expanding its presence from 12 to 18 floors. In addition, Holtzbrinck bought an option to lease the two remaining office stories. The building's owners had contemplated converting the building into apartments, but, after Holtzbrinck leased most of the space, the owners instead decided to restore the building's historical details. A 15-story vertical advertising banner covered the facade of the building in 2005, during the renovation, but it was removed after protests from many New York City residents.

Italian real estate investment firm Sorgente Group bought a majority stake in the Flatiron Building in June 2008; it had previously owned less than 20 percent of the building. The following January, Sorgente announced plans to turn it into a luxury hotel. The value of the Flatiron Building, whose zoning allowed a hotel conversion, was estimated to be $190 million. Jeffrey Gural sold his stake in the building to the Sorgente Group in November 2009 for $51.8 million. Afterward, Sorgente owned a 52 percent stake in the building, while various real estate families owned the remaining stake. By 2010, Macmillan occupied all of the building's space, except for the ground floor. 

The hotel conversion plans were hampered by the fact that Macmillan's existing lease did not expire until 2018. In a 2010 interview, Veronica Mainetti, who led the Sorgente Group's United States division, did not indicate whether Sorgente still planned to convert the building into a hotel. Mainetti subsequently said in 2015 that, when Macmillan's lease expired, "There possibly is going to be an upgrade and the building could make also a good potential hotel conversion, which we’re not completely taking off the table." Due to high demand for office space, the building's value increased 30 percent from 2009 to 2013, when it was worth between $250 million and $300 million. In July 2017, Macmillan announced it was consolidating its New York offices to the Equitable Building at 120 Broadway. Knotel, an operator of coworking spaces, subsequently announced in January 2019 that it wanted to lease all of the building's office space. The Knotel agreement was never finalized.

2010s and 2020s renovation
By June 2019, Macmillan had left the building, and all 21 office floors were vacant. GFP Real Estate announced that it would upgrade the building's interior, since the structure would be completely vacant. GFP planned to install a central air and heating system, strip away all interior partitions – leaving triangular open floors – put in a new sprinkler system and a second staircase, and upgrade the elevators.  The lobby would also be renovated.  The cost would be $60–80 million, and the project was estimated to take a year. The owners were interested in renting the entire building to a single tenant, hiring a high-profile real estate agency to find a suitable tenant. The executive director of the ownership company said: "The building was born as a commercial property, and we want to keep it as such." 

, the building was empty, and the full renovation was expected to last until at least 2022. By 2021, four of the building's five co-owners wished to sell off their combined ownership stakes due to disputes over the renovation. A New York state judge ruled in June 2022 that the four co-owners could buy out the stake of the fifth owner, Nathan Royce Silverstein, who owned a 25 percent stake in the building. According to co-owner Jeffrey Gural, Silverstein had first wanted to find a new tenant without renovating the building. Silverstein then suggested dividing the Flatiron Building into five physically separate properties, which according to Gural was infeasible for several reasons. Silverstein, by contrast, claimed that the building's renovation costs were being inflated.

Sale by auction
In March 2023, a New York Supreme Court judge ordered that the Flatiron Building be put up for sale at a public auction. The sale was announced after the owners had failed to settle their differences regarding the building's renovation. An opening bid of $40,000 was announced; the auction, scheduled to take place on March 22, 2023, is open for anyone to bid.  It was reported that the majority owners – GFP Real Estate, Newmark, and ABS Real Estate, which collectively own 75% of the building – wish to hold on to the building.

Architecture
The Flatiron Building was designed by Chicago architect Daniel Burnham as a vertical Renaissance palazzo with Beaux-Arts styling. Unlike New York's early skyscrapers, which took the form of towers arising from a lower, blockier mass, such as the contemporary Singer Building (completed in 1908), the Flatiron Building epitomizes the Chicago school conception. Filling its entire land lot, the building was constructed as a slab without any setbacks. Some sources mistakenly describe the building as one of the world's first skyscrapers or steel-framed buildings.

Early sketches by Daniel Burnham show an unexecuted clock face and a far more elaborate crown than was ultimately built. Though Burnham maintained overall control of the design process, he was not directly connected with the details of the structure as built. That task was performed by his designer Frederick P. Dinkelberg, a Pennsylvania-born architect in Burnham's office. The men had worked together since the 1893 World's Columbian Exposition in Chicago. It is unknown where the working drawings for the Flatiron Building are stored, though renderings were published at the time of construction in The American Architect and Architectural Record.

Facade 
Similar to the parts of a classical Greek column, the Flatiron Building's facade is divided into a base, shaft, and capital. The Fifth Avenue and Broadway elevations of the facade are both eighteen bays wide, while the 22nd Street elevation is eight bays wide; the bays are arranged in pairs. The southwest and southeast corners are curved, with one rounded window on each story above the base. In addition, each story of the curved prow on 23rd Street contains three sash windows; the central window is wider than the other two. Many of the Flatiron Building's tenants referred to the prow as "the Point".

The facade of the three-story base is made of limestone. Each of the openings at the base is two bays wide. There are entrances on either end of the 22nd Street elevation, as well as at the centers of the Fifth Avenue and Broadway elevations. Above the base, the facade is made of glazed terracotta from the Atlantic Terra Cotta Company in Tottenville, Staten Island. The building also contains decorative details such as cornices, moldings, and oriel windows. These materials were intended to give the impression of "general unity in treatment", while also giving the facade a textured appearance.

Base 
At ground level, the entrances on Fifth Avenue and Broadway are each flanked by four storefront windows to the north and south. The storefront windows are separated from each other by vertical piers with horizontal bands of smooth-faced and vermiculated limestone. There are revolving doors at the southwestern and southeastern corners of the building. The entrances on Fifth Avenue and Broadway are flanked by a pair of engaged columns, which are vertically fluted and are overlaid by smooth and vermiculated bands of limestone. The columns support an entablature decorated with alternating roundels and triglyphs; immediately above the entablature, on the second story, are oculus windows with console brackets on either side. The entablatures above both entrances are connected by a projecting cornice that wraps around the ground floor. On the second and third stories, each opening generally contains two sash windows. A frieze with dentils runs above the third story.

The prow of the building, facing 23rd Street, includes a pair of two-story-high Classical columns. These were echoed at the top of the building by two columns that supported the cornice. The single-story "cowcatcher" retail space in front of the prow, added to the plans in 1902, was not part of Burnham or Dinkelberg's design. Burnham initially did not want to add the "cowcatcher" space, since he believed it would ruin the symmetry of the prow's design, but he was forced to accept the addition on Black's insistence.

Upper stories 
The 4th story is designed as a transitional story, with eight sash windows on 22nd Street, as well as 18 sash windows each on Broadway and Fifth Avenue. The windows are flanked by alternating wide and narrow piers, each of which contains terracotta panels with decorations such as foliate motifs, masks, lozenges, and wreaths. Above the 4th story is a frieze with roundels, as well as a cornice.

The 12-story midsection spans the 5th through 16th stories. The 5th and 6th stories each contain sash windows similar to those on the 4th story, but the terracotta piers between each bay are decorated in a simpler design. A frieze with a meander pattern wraps around the building above the 6th story. The Broadway and Fifth Avenue facades both contain three projecting trapezoidal oriels on the 7th through 14th stories; each oriel contains three windows per story. At the time of the Flatiron Building's construction, relatively few skyscrapers in New York City used oriels, but they were commonly used in Chicago to break up winds. The 15th story contains sash windows separated by rusticated brick piers. The 16th story contains arched windows; the voussoirs above these windows support a cornice that runs above that story. The 17th story is also designed as a transitional story, with alternating wide and narrow piers decorated with roundels and lions' heads. Another projecting cornice runs above the 17th story.

The capital consists of the top four stories. The 18th and 19th stories contain an arcade of double-height, double-width arches. Each archway contains a metal frame with multiple glass panes. There are metal spandrel panels between the windows on the 18th and 19th stories. The arches themselves are separated vertically by ornate terracotta piers, topped by capitals with masks and wreaths. The 20th story contains small square windows, above which is a deep cornice with dentils and brackets; the cornice projects about  beyond the building's perimeter. There are decorative triglyphs between the 20th-story windows.

The 20th story was originally topped by an attic for mechanical equipment; the 21st-story penthouse was added in a subsequent renovation. The attic still exists and is placed between the 20th and 21st stories. Initially, the penthouse was not surrounded by a railing; a balustrade was subsequently added above the 20th story. At the building's apex were originally two terracotta sculptures of cherubs. The cherubs symbolized the building's "guardian spirits" and held scrolls that surrounded a tablet with George A. Fuller's name. The statues were removed to an unknown location in the late 1980s, and a set of replacement cherubs were installed in 2001 after preservationists filed a complaint with the LPC.

Structural features
Purdy and Henderson were the structural engineers, and Hamilton J. Chapman was the chief consulting engineer for the project. The construction of the Flatiron was made feasible by a change to New York City's building codes in 1892, which eliminated the requirement that masonry be used for fireproofing considerations. This opened the way for steel-skeleton construction. The steel-frame technique was familiar to the Fuller Company, a contracting firm with considerable expertise in building such tall structures. The Flatiron Building's construction was relatively easy because it used a steel frame; its 22-story height would have been difficult using other construction methods of that time. The steel bracing, designed by engineer Corydon Purdy of Purdy and Henderson, allowed the Flatiron Building to withstand four times the amount of wind force it could ever be expected to endure. In theory, the frame would remain standing even if the rest of the building were to tip over. 

The building's frame contains  of steel. At the vertex, the triangular tower is only  or 6.5 feet (2 m) wide. The Broadway and Fifth Avenue elevations meet at an angle of about 25 degrees.

Foundation 
The foundation itself consists of concrete footings with granite caps, above which rise the building's steel columns.

The basement extends beyond the building's lot line, occupying vaults underneath the sidewalk and roadways. These spaces are surrounded by the retaining walls. The ceiling of the vaults is supported by 18 steel columns outside the building's lot line. The steel columns are recessed behind the retaining wall and are connected to the retaining wall by horizontal girders, which support the sidewalks above.

Superstructure 

The superstructure is primarily supported by 36 built-up steel columns. Twenty-five of these columns are placed on the building's perimeter: five on 22nd Street and ten each on Fifth Avenue and Broadway. Five of the interior columns are recessed  from the Fifth Avenue facade, and there are several interior columns at the south end of the building. At each story, the columns are connected horizontally by a grid of steel girders and floor beams, which mostly run parallel to the Manhattan street grid. The spaces between the horizontal girders are spanned by flat arches made of terracotta. Each column is connected to the horizontal beams by triangular gusset plates, placed both above and below the beams. 

From the 1st to the 12th stories, the outer walls are carried on plate girders; the remaining stories contain wall girders, with channels engraved into their surfaces. There is also a masonry pier adjacent to each of the columns on the building's perimeter. The framework at the first story is similar to that at the basement, except at the corners and above each entrance. At ground level, the building's northern prow is cantilevered from a pair of elliptical girders, while the southwest and southeast corners contain diagonal floor beams. On the upper stories, the corners contain curved wall girders and diagonal floor beams of varying dimensions. In addition, the oriel windows and some of the facade's decorative details are cantilevered from the outer walls. On the 18th through 20th stories, the columns are recessed from the outer wall.

Purdy and Henderson designed two systems of wind bracing for the building. One system consists of diagonal steel bars shaped like a rotated "K", which extend downward from the centers of the horizontal girders. The other system of bracing is similar, but the diagonal steel bars extend both upward and downward from the horizontal girders. A supplemental system of transverse bracing is also used between the foundation and the second floor.

Interior
The building was considered to be "quirky" overall, with drafty wood-framed and cooper-clad windows, no central air conditioning, a heating system which utilized cast-iron radiators, an antiquated sprinkler system, and a single staircase should evacuation of the building be necessary. The offices were furnished with mahogany and oak, which the Fuller Company advertised as "fireproof". The triangular shape of the structure led to a "rabbit warren" of oddly-shaped rooms. The offices on each floor were connected by a central passageway, and each floor contained about 20 office cubicles, all of which were connected by various doors. According to The New York Times, offices in the prow had "impressive" views "because of the converging traffic street markings, which accent the telescoping boulevards, and because of the changing seasons in Madison Square Park". 

The building contained its own power plant, which generated high-pressure steam and electricity. In the 1940s, it was one of a few remaining structures in New York City with its own power plant. Bathrooms for males and females are placed on alternating floors, with the men's rooms on even floors and the women's rooms on odd ones. Originally, there were no restrooms for women. 

Until the end of the 20th century, the building also retained its original hydraulic elevators, which were powered by water. Otis Elevator manufactured six hydraulic elevators for the building, although Hecla Iron Works constructed the original elevator cabs. The elevators had a reputation for being slow and, when the elevators' hydraulic pipes burst, water would often leak into the elevator cabs. To reach the top floor – the 21st, which was added in 1905, three years after the building was completed – a second elevator has to be taken from the 20th floor. On the 21st floor, the bottoms of the windows are chest-high.

Impact and response

Status as an icon 
The Flatiron Building became an icon of New York City upon completion, and public response to it was enthusiastic. The structure attracted not only "sidewalk superintendents" – members of the general public who expressed great interest in the project – but also architects and engineers. Crowds of several hundred people looked at the building "for five and ten minutes at a time", often from multiple vantage points, while the Tribune said that crowds would sometimes look at the building "with their heads bent back until a general breakage of necks seems imminent". By the mid-20th century, the building no longer attracted crowds, and most tourists "want[ed] to go up in the Flatiron only to take pictures of other taller buildings". However, it remained well known, even after taller buildings such as the Chrysler Building and the Empire State Building were constructed. According to graphic designer Miriam Berman, the building's enduring popularity was attributed to the fact that it was "the only famous Manhattan skyscraper that enables tourists to take a picture of the entire building from the ground up".

According to The New York Times, the Flatiron Building was "considered 'the most photographed structure' in New York" in its early years. In part because of its unusual shape and prominent location next to Madison Square Park, it was depicted in books and postcards worldwide. As an icon of New York City, the Flatiron Building was also depicted on other pieces of merchandise, such as plates, mugs, and tchotchkes. The building's exterior remains a popular spot for tourist photographs, making it "possibly one of the most photographed buildings in the world." The Flatiron's status as an icon also led to a trademark dispute in 1999, when Newmark & Company and venture capital firm Flatiron Partners (which was headquartered in a different building) both tried to register an image of the building as a trademark. Flatiron Partners, which had wanted to use the building's image as its logo, ultimately licensed the image from Newmark & Company. 

The New York City Landmarks Preservation Commission (LPC) designated the Flatiron Building as a city landmark in 1966. The structure, along with the Manhattan Municipal Building, were the first two skyscrapers in New York City to be protected as city landmarks. The Flatiron Building was added to the National Register of Historic Places (NRHP) in 1979. The structure was re-added to the NRHP in 1989 when it was designated a National Historic Landmark. The LPC further designated the Flatiron Building as part of the Ladies' Mile Historic District, a city landmark district created in 1989.

Critical reception 
When the building was completed, critical response was not completely positive, and what praise it garnered was often for the cleverness of its engineering. Montgomery Schuyler, editor of Architectural Record, said that its "awkwardness [is] entirely undisguised, and without even an attempt to disguise them, if they have not even been aggravated by the treatment. ... The treatment of the tip is an additional and it seems wanton aggravation of the inherent awkwardness of the situation." He praised the building's surface, and the detailing of its terra-cotta work, but questioned the practicality of its large number of windows: "[The tenant] can, perhaps, find wall space within for one roll top desk without overlapping the windows, with light close in front of him and close behind him and close on one side of him. But suppose he needed a bookcase? Undoubtedly he has a highly eligible place from which to view processions. But for the transaction of business?"

Before the Flatiron Building was completed, Life magazine wrote: "Madison Square is not a bad-looking place as it is, and ought to be one of the beauty spots of the city. It is grievous to think that its fair proportions are to be marred by this outlandish structure." Sculptor William Ordway Partridge remarked in 1904 that it was "a disgrace to our city, an outrage to our sense of the artistic, and a menace to life". The New-York Tribune called the new building "A stingy piece of pie ... the greatest inanimate troublemaker in New York". The Municipal Art Society said that it was "unfit to be in the Center of the City", and The New York Times called it a "monstrosity". Even later, Christopher Gray of the Times wrote in 1991: "The facade itself is handsome but not exceptional for its time."

Some critics saw the building differently. Futurist H. G. Wells wrote in his 1906 book The Future in America: A Search After Realities: "I found myself agape, admiring a sky-scraper the prow of the Flat-iron Building, to be particular, ploughing up through the traffic of Broadway and Fifth Avenue in the afternoon light." Architect Robert A. M. Stern wrote in 1983 that the Flatiron was among the city's first buildings to "convincingly express the romantic characteristics of the skyscraper". Karl Zimmermann of The Washington Post wrote in 1987 that the Flatiron was "an idiosyncratic wedge blanketed with French Renaissance ornamentation, still remarkable today in its lightness, grace and novelty."

Photographs 

The Flatiron was to attract the attention of numerous artists and photographers. It was the subject of one of Edward Steichen's atmospheric photographs, taken on a wet wintry late afternoon in 1904, as well as a memorable image by Alfred Stieglitz taken the year before, to which Steichen was paying homage. Stieglitz reflected on the dynamic symbolism of the building, noting upon seeing it one day during a snowstorm that "... it appeared to be moving toward me like the bow of a monster ocean steamer – a picture of a new America still in the making." He remarked that the Flatiron had a comparable effect on New York as the Parthenon had on Athens. When Stieglitz's photograph was published in Camera Work, his friend Sadakichi Hartmann, a writer, painter and photographer, accompanied it with an essay on the building: "A curious creation, no doubt, but can it be called beautiful? Beauty is a very abstract idea ... Why should the time not arrive when the majority without hesitation will pronounce the 'Flat-iron' a thing of beauty?"

Besides Stieglitz and Steichen, photographers such as Alvin Langdon Coburn and Jessie Tarbox Beals took photographs of the building. Painters of the Ashcan School, like John Sloan, Everett Shinn, and Ernest Lawson also painted images of the building, as did Paul Cornoyer and Childe Hassam. Lithographer Joseph Pennell, illustrator John Edward Jackson, and French Cubist Albert Gleizes all took the Flatiron as the subject of their work. The edifice was also depicted in Samuel Halpert's 1919 painting Flatiron Building, later placed in the Metropolitan Museum of Art's collection.

Wind gusts and "23 skidoo" 

The building's most common criticism focused on its structure, on the grounds that the "combination of triangular shape and height would cause the building to fall down". When construction began, locals placed bets on how far the debris would spread when the wind knocked the building down. This presumed susceptibility to damage had also given it the nickname "Burnham's Folly". The Brooklyn Daily Eagle was one of a few contemporary sources to describe the building's shape favorably, saying: "A triangle is the safest possible form of building, as the triangle is the strongest of the geometric form."

Due to the geography of the site, with Broadway on one side, Fifth Avenue on the other, and the open expanse of Madison Square and the park in front of it, the wind currents around the building could be treacherous. Wind from the north would split around the building, downdrafts from above and updrafts from the vaulted area under the street would combine to make the wind unpredictable. The winds raised women's skirts and scattered paper bills from pedestrians' pocketbooks. According to some accounts, this gave rise to the phrase "23 skidoo" (sometimes spelled "23 skiddoo"). Policemen would shout this phrase at men who tried to get glimpses of women's dresses being blown up by the winds swirling around the building due to the strong downdrafts. Films from the Library of Congress confirm that the building's shape did contribute to high winds around the intersection of Broadway, Fifth Avenue, and 23rd Street. However, the origin of the phrase "23 skidoo" itself is disputed; even before the building was constructed, the number "twenty-three" and the word "skidoo" were independently used as expressions of dismissal.

The winds allegedly also caused damage to neighboring structures, prompting some critics to request that the Flatiron Building be shortened or demolished. The winds prompted a lawsuit from a nearby property owner, and they were also blamed for the 1903 death of a bicycle messenger, who was blown into the street and run over by a car. Newspapers of the time also claimed that "every window in the building" would break in high winds, although the American Architect and Building News observed that only a few windows broke during one such instance of high winds. Pedestrians were initially reluctant to walk on the same side of the street as the Flatiron Building because of concerns over the wind gusts, but these concerns had largely dissipated by the mid-20th century.

Design influence 

Unlike other structures, such as the Seagram Building or New York City's brownstone houses, the Flatiron Building's shape was rarely copied by other structures in the city until the early 21st century. This was in part because many buildings occupied rectangular sites on Manhattan's street grid; furthermore, developers tended to avoid buying oddly-shaped plots, as their unconventional dimensions were hard to market to potential tenants. Consequently, in the early 20th century, the Flatiron Building was one of only two major buildings that were developed at the intersection of Broadway and another north–south avenue; the other was the Times Tower. Although some buildings in lower Manhattan, such as One Wall Street Court, also contain a flatiron shape, they generally were not as well known as the Flatiron Building. A shortage of available land lots prompted the development of other triangular structures in the city during the 2010s, such as 10 Sullivan and 100 Franklin.

In popular culture 

One of the first films to depict the Flatiron Building was created by Robert Bonine, who used a kinetograph to film the building on October 8, 1902, a week after the building opened. In the 1958 comedy film Bell, Book and Candle, James Stewart and Kim Novak were filmed on top of the Flatiron Building in a romantic clinch. For Warren Beatty's 1980 film Reds, the base of the building was used for a scene with Diane Keaton.

Today, the Flatiron Building is frequently used in television commercials and documentaries as an easily recognizable symbol of the city, shown, for instance, in the opening credits of the Late Show with David Letterman or in scenes of New York City that are shown during scene transitions in the TV sitcoms Friends, Spin City, and Veronica's Closet. In 1987, the building was used as the scene of a murder for the TV series Murder, She Wrote, in the episode "No Accounting for Murder". In the 1998 film Godzilla, the Flatiron Building is accidentally destroyed by the US Army while in pursuit of Godzilla. It is depicted as the headquarters of the Daily Bugle, for which Peter Parker is a freelance photographer, in Sam Raimi's Spider-Man trilogy, and once again in The Spectacular Spider-Man animated series. It is shown as the location of the Channel 6 News headquarters where April O'Neil works in the Teenage Mutant Ninja Turtles TV series. The Flatiron Building is also the home of the fictional company Damage Control in the Marvel Universe comics and for the CIA-sponsored superhero management team "The Boys" in the Dynamite Comics title of the same name (as well as in Season 3 of the TV series The Boys).

In 2013, the Whitney Museum of American Art installed a life-sized 3D-cutout replica of Edward Hopper's 1942 painting Nighthawks in the Flatiron Art Space in the building's prow. Although Hopper said his picture was inspired by a diner in Greenwich Village, the prow is reminiscent of the painting, and was selected to display the two-dimensional cutouts.

In 2014, the Lego Architecture series produced a model of the Flatiron Building to add to their landmark series. The subsequent New York City set, introduced in 2015, also included the building.

The Flatiron Building was also the subject of a book, The Flatiron: The New York Landmark and the Incomparable City that Arose With It, published in 2010 and written by Alice Sparberg Alexiou.

Gallery

See also

Buildings
 Sibley Triangle Building, Rochester, New York (1897)
 47 Plaza Street West, Brooklyn
 10 Sullivan
 , Meatpacking District, Manhattan (1849)
 Phelan Building, San Francisco (1881)
 Gooderham Building, Toronto (1892)
 English-American Building, Atlanta (1897)
 Columbus Tower (San Francisco) (1907)
 Vesteda Toren, Eindhoven, the Netherlands (2006)
 Het Strijkijzer, The Hague, the Netherlands (2007)
 Other Flatiron Buildings

General
 Early skyscrapers
 Flatiron District
 Ladies' Mile Historic District
 Madison Square

References
Informational notes

Citations

Bibliography

 
 

 
 

Further reading

External links

New York Architecture listing

1902 establishments in New York City
23rd Street (Manhattan)
Articles containing video clips
Broadway (Manhattan)
Chicago school architecture in New York (state)
Fifth Avenue
Flatiron District
Headquarters in the United States
National Historic Landmarks in Manhattan
New York City Designated Landmarks in Manhattan
Office buildings completed in 1902
Office buildings on the National Register of Historic Places in Manhattan
Renaissance Revival architecture in New York City
Skyscraper office buildings in Manhattan
Triangular buildings
Flatiron buildings